Nicrophorus nigricornis is a burying beetle described by Faldermann in 1835.

References

Silphidae
Beetles of North America
Beetles described in 1835